Jackie Alpers (born 1968) is an American photographer and author of several cookbooks. She is a winner of the Black & White Spider Award's Merit of Excellence. She is known for her food photography, documentary-style portraits and photo-illustration.

Biography
Jackie Alpers was born on April 1, 1968, in Columbus, Ohio, to Richard Alpers and Lois Cramer. She attended the Columbus College of Art & Design from 1987 to 1991, where she studied photography, painting, graphics, and illustration. She moved to Tucson, Arizona in 1993. There she spent four years as the managing photo editor at Swanstock, the fine art photography division of Getty Images. She is married to Jason Willis, they reside in Tucson.

Food photography and writing
Alpers writes and photographs a monthly column for the Food Network and also contributes recipes and photography to Refinery29, Random House’s Tastebook, The Kitchn, Today Food and Edible Baja Arizona Magazine among others. She has been featured in articles for Reader’s Digest, CNN, Good Morning America, The New York Times & NPR. Her food blog Jackie’s Happy Plate has been featured in numerous online publications including Cosmopolitan, Esquire, Glamour, Better Homes and Gardens, MSN and BuzzFeed.

1997—2006
Alpers started her photography career with an illustration to one of the Ursula Hegi books in 1997. A year later, she did a cover photograph for Water Marked published by Scribner Books. The 21st century began with a bronze medal that she got at the London Photographic Awards and published in the 23rd and 24th volumes of American Photography. In 2005 she took an interview with Photo District News and in 2006 created a cover for F-shop Magazine and also for book Pesach for the Rest of Us which was printed by Random House.

2007—2013
In 2007 she had two more interviews; one for Area of Design and the other for HOW magazine. The same year she did another cover design this time for St. Martin's Minotaur's book called Heartsick. In 2008 she was interviewed by Tucson Weekly and next year made cover photographs for Vanilla Ride designed by Chip Kidd, and A History of Ghosts written by Peter Aykroyd. In 2010 she did cookbook photography for three books published by Globe Pequot Press and the same year did food photography for The Official Arizona State Visitor’s Guide. In 2011 she did the same for Phoenix Official Visitors Guide and had an interview with The New York Times. In 2012 she had interviews with both Good Morning America and CNN and the same year did food photography for Tucson Official Visitors Guide. A year later she was nominated at the Photography Masters Cup in food photography. She also has done editorial photography for magazines such as AARP and Real Eats and publishers like Rovio Entertainment, Sterling, Quirk Books and Simon & Schuster.

2014—2020
In 2014 she had two more interviews; one featured on the cover of Tucson Lifestyle Magazine and the other for NPR/(National Public Radio). The same year she started writing and photographing feature articles for the Food Network, contributing additional articles, photography, and how-to videos through 2020. Alpers also continued to write and photograph feature articles for Refinery29, Random House's Taste Cooking, Edible Communities and The Kitchn. In 2020 her cookbook Taste of Tucson: Sonoran Style Recipes Inspired by the Rich Culture of Southern Arizona was published by West Margin Press/Ingram Content Group, and the same year she was nominated for both the IPA/(Photography Masters Cup) and International Color Awards in food photography.

Bibliography
Taste of Tucson: Sonoran-Style Recipes Inspired by the Rich Culture of Southern Arizona, author & photographer (West Margin Press, 2020)
Sprinkles!: Recipes and Ideas for Rainbowlicious Desserts, author & photographer (Quirk Books, 2013)
Angry Birds, Bad Piggies Best Egg Recipes, photographer & editor, hardback book, and interactive app. (Rovio Entertainment, 2012)
Mexican Cooking, photographer, (Globe Pequot Press, 2010)
The Calorie Counter Cookbook, photographer, (Globe Pequot Press, 2010) 
Knack Low Salt Cooking, photographer, (Globe Pequot Press, 2009)
A History of Ghosts, cover photography, (2009)
Vanilla Ride, cover photography (Knopf 2009)

References

External links
 Official website for Jackie Alpers
 Jackie's Blog: Jackie's Happy Plate
 Official News and Press Blog for Jackie Alpers
 
 Interview with Jackie Alpers on NPR

Living people
1968 births
American women photographers
Artists from Tucson, Arizona
21st-century American women